William Little (26 January 1911 – 17 December 2004) was an English professional rugby league footballer who played in the 1930s and 1940s.

Background
Little was born in the small mining village of Great Clifton, Cumberland, and in his early days he played for the village's club, and he died aged 93 in Barrow-in-Furness, Cumbria, England.

Playing career

International honours
Little won caps for England while at Barrow in 1933 against Other Nationalities, and in 1934 against Australia, and France.

County honours
Little represented Cumberland.

Challenge Cup Final appearances
Little played , and scored a drop goal with his left-foot in Barrow's 4-7 defeat by Salford in the 1938 Challenge Cup Final during the 1937–38 season at Wembley, London on 7 May 1938, and was a reserve in Barrow's 0-10 defeat by Wigan in the 1950–51 Challenge Cup Final at Wembley Stadium, London on 5 May 1951.

County Cup Final appearances
Little played  in Barrow's 4-8 defeat by Warrington in the 1937 Lancashire County Cup Final during the 1937–38 season at Central Park, Wigan on 23 October 1937.

Testimonial match
Little's testimonial matches at Barrow were shared with Bob Ayres, Val Cumberbatch, John Higgin and Dan McKeating, and took place against Swinton on 27 April 1946, and against Oldham on 27 January 1947.

Contemporaneous article extract
On 25 January 1947, Little was described in the programme of the Big Five Benefit as "the man who spelt the end to Halifax R.L. Cup hopes in 1938. Member of a famous Great Clifton football family. International and Cumberland County man."

References

External links
(archived by web.archive.org) Back on the Wembley trail
(archived by web.archive.org) Barrow RLFC > Hall Of Fame > Billy Little

1911 births
2004 deaths
Barrow Raiders players
Cumberland rugby league team players
England national rugby league team players
English rugby league coaches
English rugby league players
Rugby league halfbacks
Rugby league players from Cumbria
Whitehaven R.L.F.C. coaches